Eupholidota ("true pangolins") is a suborder of pangolins that includes two superfamilies: extant Manoidea and extinct Eomanoidea.

Taxonomy 
 Suborder: Eupholidota (true pangolins)
 Superfamily: Manoidea
 Family: Manidae (pangolins)
 Family: †Patriomanidae
 Incertae sedis
 Genus: †Necromanis
 Superfamily: †Eomanoidea
 Family: †Eomanidae

Phylogeny 
Phylogenetic position of suborder Eupholidota within order Pholidota.

References 

Pangolins